The 45th Annual Tony Awards was broadcast by CBS from the Minskoff Theatre on June 2, 1991. The hosts were Julie Andrews and Jeremy Irons.

The ceremony
Presenters: Carol Channing, Joan Collins, Tyne Daly, Whoopi Goldberg, Joel Grey, Steve Guttenberg, Audrey Hepburn, Raul Julia, Jackie Mason, Shirley MacLaine, James Naughton, Penn & Teller, Anthony Quinn, Lily Tomlin, Denzel Washington

Musicals represented: 
 Miss Saigon ("The Heat is On in Saigon"/"Last Night of the World"/"I Still Believe"/"You Will Not Touch Him"/"The American Dream" - Lea Salonga, Jonathan Pryce. Company)
 Once on This Island ("The Human Heart"/"Mama Will Provide" - La Chanze, Lillias White, Company)
 The Secret Garden (Medley - Company)
 The Will Rogers Follies ("Will-A-Mania"/"Favorite Son" - Keith Carradine, Cady Huffman, Company)

Special Salute:
 How to Succeed in Business Without Really Trying ("The Year of the Musical Actor"/"I Believe in You" - Robert Morse)
 Fiddler on the Roof ("If I Were a Rich Man" - Topol)
 Bye Bye Birdie ("Rosie" - Tommy Tune and Ann Reinking [a live remote from Seattle])
 My Fair Lady and Camelot medley performed by Julie Andrews ("Wouldn't It Be Loverly" "Camelot" "I Could Have Danced All Night")
 The Phantom of the Opera ("Music of the Night" - Michael Crawford)

Award winners and nominees
Winners are in bold

Special Tony Awards
Regional Theatre Award -- Yale Repertory Theater, New Haven, Connecticut
Tony Honor—Father George Moore (Given Posthumously)

Multiple nominations and awards

These productions had multiple nominations:

11 nominations: Miss Saigon and The Will Rogers Follies 
8 nominations: Once on This Island
7 nominations: The Secret Garden  
6 nominations: Our Country's Good 
5 nominations: La Bête and Lost in Yonkers 
4 nominations: Six Degrees of Separation 
2 nominations: Fiddler on the Roof, Oh, Kay!, Peter Pan, Shadowlands, Shōgun: The Musical, The Speed of Darkness and Those Were the Days

The following productions received multiple awards.

6 wins: The Will Rogers Follies 
4 wins: Lost in Yonkers  
3 wins: Miss Saigon and The Secret Garden

See also
 Drama Desk Awards
 1991 Laurence Olivier Awards – equivalent awards for West End theatre productions
 Obie Award
 New York Drama Critics' Circle
 Theatre World Award
 Lucille Lortel Awards

External links
Official Site Tony Awards

Tony Awards ceremonies
1991 in theatre
1991 theatre awards
1991 in New York City
1991 awards in the United States